Gil Seon-ju (25 March 1869 – 26 November 1935), considered by some to be the father of Korean Christianity, was one of the first Koreans ordained as a Presbyterian minister. He was an early supporter of Korean nationalism and helped shape the nature of the Korean Protestant Christianity.

Biography 
Gil Seon-ju converted to Christianity in 1897 after recognizing the dire state of Korea and claiming to have experienced a mysterious encounter with God during extended prayer. He was one of the first graduates of the Presbyterian Seminary in Pyongyang in 1907 and became the pastor of the Central Presbyterian Church of Pyongyang.

After graduating from seminary, Gil was involved in the Korean revival movement and would be one of the key figures of the Great Pyongyang revival of 1907. Bringing Korean folk religiosity into Christianity, Gil would also pioneer the spiritual practice of early morning prayers, today recognized as one of the key expressions of Korean Christian spirituality.

Gil Seon-ju also had a strong sense of Korean nationalism. He was also involved with the March 1st Independence Movement of 1919, being one of the key signers of the Declaration of Independence, resulting in his imprisonment under the Japanese occupation.

See also 

 Christianity in Korea
 March 1st Movement

References 

Presbyterianism in Korea
1869 births
1935 deaths
Korean Presbyterian ministers
Korean independence activists
Haepyeong Gil clan